Mohammad Amir Khan (born 29 December 1993) is an Indian field hockey player who plays as a forward. He represented India at the 2009 Men's Hockey Junior World Cup and made his senior team debut later that year at the age of 16.

References

External links
Player profile at Hockey India

1993 births
Living people
Field hockey players from Allahabad
Indian male field hockey players